Babelomurex indicus is a species of sea snail, a marine gastropod mollusc in the family Muricidae, the murex snails or rock snails.

Description

Distribution

References

indicus
Gastropods described in 1899